This is a list of programs broadcast by Hallmark Channel in the United States, both past and present. For international versions of the channel, see Hallmark Channel (International). Shows that premiered prior to August 2001 also aired on the channel when it was branded Odyssey.

Current programming

Drama

Syndicated
Frasier (2011)
Cheers (2010)
Reba (2020)
The Golden Girls (2009)

Upcoming original programming

Drama

Former programming

Morning
 Donna's Day (1999–2001)
Telling Stories with Tomie dePaola (August-October 2001)
Home & Family (October 1, 2012 – August 4, 2021)

Original

Specials
Kitten Bowl (2014-2021; moving to GAC Family in 2023)

Syndicated

 7th Heaven (2008–2010)
 The Addams Family (2010)
 The Adventures of the Black Stallion (1996–1998)
 Agapeland (1993–1994)
 Airwaves (1992–1993)
 ALF (1999–2002)
 Alfred Hitchcock Hour (2003)
 Aliens in the Family (1999–2000)
 America's Funniest Home Videos (2001–2002; 2010)
 The Archie Show (1999–2000)
 Avonlea (1999–2001)
 Beauty and the Beast (1999–2001)
 The Beverly Hillbillies (2002–2005)
 Bewitched (2001–2003)
 The Big Valley (2003–2005)
 The Bob Newhart Show (2012)
 Bonanza (2002–2006)
 The Brady Bunch (2013–2014; 2016)
 Brentwood Kids (1996–1997)
 Brooklyn Bridge (1996–1998)
 Camp Cariboo (1996–1998)
 The Campbells (1992–1996)
 Christy (2000–2001)
 Columbo (2005–2007)**
 The Courtship of Eddie's Father (1996–1998)
 Davey and Goliath (1992–1999)
 Diagnosis: Murder (2006–2008)**
 Doc (2010)
 Doogie Howser, M.D. (1999–2000)
 Dr. Quinn, Medicine Woman (2000–2005)***
 Emeril's Table *
 Empty Nest (2011)
 The Equalizer (2003–2004)
 Everyday Food*
 The Facts of Life (2002)
 Family Ties (2006)
 Fat Albert and the Cosby Kids (1999–2000)
 Father Murphy (1995–1999)
 Fraggle Rock (1999–2001)
 Fraggle Rock: The Animated Series (1999–2000)
 Fred Penner's Place (1997–1998)
 From Martha's Garden*
 From Martha's Home*
 From Martha's Kitchen*
 Frugal Gourmet (1995–1997)
 Full House (2018)
 Gerbert (1993–1997)
 The Ghost of Faffner Hall (1999)
 Gilligan's Island (2004–2005)
The Golden Girls (2011-2022)
 The Good Wife **
 Happy Days (2000–2001; 2013)
 Hart to Hart (2001–2002)**
 Hawaii Five-O (2003–2004)
 Hogan's Heroes (2002–2005)
 I Dream of Jeannie (2001–2003)
 I Love Lucy (2009–2020)
 Jack Hanna's Animal Adventures (2009–2010)
 JAG (2004–2006)
 Jane Doe miniseries **
 Jim Henson's Animal Show (1999–2001)
 Join In! (1992–1993)
 Joy Junction (1992–1993)
 Just Kids (1992–1997)
 Judging Amy (2005)
 Kingdom Adventure (1994–1995)
 Kojak movies
 Laura McKenzie's Traveler *
 Little House on the Prairie (2003–2016)
 Mad Hungry with Lucinda Scala Quinn *
 The Magnificent Seven (2003–2004)
 Marie*
 Marshal Dillon (2002–2003)
 Martha Bakes *
 The Martha Stewart Show * 
 The Mary Tyler Moore Show (2012)
 M*A*S*H (2003–2012)
 Matlock (2003–2009)***
 Max Glick (1994–1996)
 McBride miniseries **
 Mother Goose Stories (1999–2000)
 The Munsters (2010)
 Muppet Babies (1999–2000)
 The Muppet Show (1999–2001)
 Murder, She Wrote (2007–2009)** 
 My Three Sons (2000–2002)
 Mystery Woman miniseries **
 The Nature of Things (1993–1996)
 New Morning with Timberly Whitfield
 Northern Exposure (2001–2005)
 Numb3rs (2012–2013)
 Once Upon a Hamster (1997–1999)
 Our House (1996–1999)
 Palmerstown, U.S.A. (1995–1996)
 The Partridge Family (2010)
 Peppermint Place (1994–1997)
 Perry Mason (2002–2008)**
 Petkeeping with Marc Morrone 
 Quigley's Village (1992–1993)
 Ramona (1996–1997)
 Rawhide
 Rescue 911 (2000–2001)
 The Rifleman (2001–2005)
 The Rockford Files movies
 Secret Life of Toys (2000)
 Sister Kate (1998–1999)
 Snowy River: The McGregor Saga (1999–2001)
 The Sullivans (1992–1996)
 Sunshine Factory (1992–1996)
 Today's Special (1992–1996)
 Trapper John, M.D. (1998–1999)
 Touched by an Angel (2002–2011)***
 The Virginian (2003–2005)
 Walker, Texas Ranger (2004–2009)
 The Waltons (2003–2009; 2011–2016)
 Whatever, Martha! *
 Whatever with Alexis and Jennifer*
 Whatever, You're Wrong! *
 Who Let the Dogs Out?
 Wind at My Back (2000–2001)
 Zoobilee Zoo (1999–2000)

(*) – programs that formerly aired on Hallmark Channel Daytime

(**) – programming currently airs on sister station Hallmark Movies & Mysteries

(***) – programming currently airs on sister station Hallmark Drama

See also
 List of Hallmark Channel Original Movies (and Category)
 List of Hallmark Hall of Fame episodes (and Category)

References

Hallmark